Lithium imide is an inorganic compound with the chemical formula . This white solid can be formed by a reaction between lithium amide and lithium hydride.

 LiNH2 + LiH → Li2NH + H2

The product is light-sensitive and can undergo disproportionation to form lithium nitride, which is characteristically red.

2 Li2NH → LiNH2 + Li3N

Lithium imide is thought to have a simple face-centered cubic structure with a Fmm space group; with N-H bond distances of 0.82(6) Å and a H–N–H bond angle of 109.5°, giving it a similar structure to lithium amide.

Lithium imide is strongly basic and deprotonates even some extremely weak acids such as methane and ammonia, due to the very localized negative charge on the nitrogen, which carries two formal charges. It has uses in organic and organometallic chemistry. It has been investigated as a material for hydrogen storage.

References 

Inorganic imides
Lithium compounds
Nitrogen(−III) compounds
Hydrogen compounds